History Never Repeats – The Best of Split Enz is a compilation of hits by New Zealand rock band Split Enz. Initially released in the US in 1987, then in New Zealand and Australia in 1989, the album has been through many variations and reissues over the years.

Track listings

US version, 1987
Released by the band's Northern Hemisphere record label A&M Records, this version included the band's hits on the label. It was re-packaged in 2002 as The Best of Split Enz – The Millennium Collection as part of Universal Music's "20th Century Masters" budget-priced series.

 "I Got You" 3:31 (Neil Finn)
 "Hard Act to Follow" 3:17 (Tim Finn)
 "Six Months in a Leaky Boat" 4:27 (Tim Finn/Split Enz)
 "What's The Matter With You" 3:08 (Neil Finn)
 "One Step Ahead" 2:53 (Neil Finn)
 "I See Red" 3:16 (Tim Finn)
 "Message to My Girl" 4:02 (Neil Finn)
 "History Never Repeats" 3:00 (Neil Finn)
 "I Hope I Never" 4:33 (Tim Finn)
 "Dirty Creature" 4:03 (Tim Finn/Nigel Griggs/Neil Finn)
 "Poor Boy" 3:26 (Tim Finn)

Original NZ/AUS version, 1989
The version released in New Zealand and Australia features a different track listing that includes the hits in those two countries.

 "Give It a Whirl" (Tim Finn/Neil Finn)
 "My Mistake" (Tim Finn/Eddie Rayner)
 "I See Red" (Tim Finn)
 "Late Last Night" [single version] (Phil Judd)
 "I Got You" (Neil Finn)
 "Shark Attack" (Tim Finn)
 "Poor Boy" (Tim Finn)
 "I Hope I Never" (Tim Finn)
 "History Never Repeats" (Neil Finn)
 "One Step Ahead" (Neil Finn)
 "Dirty Creature" (Tim Finn/Nigel Griggs/Neil Finn)
 "Pioneer" (Eddie Rayner)
 "Six Months in a Leaky Boat" (Tim Finn/Split Enz)
 "Strait Old Line" (Neil Finn)
 "Message to My Girl" (Neil Finn)
 "Charlie" [live Auckland, 1984] (Tim Finn)

NZ/AUS 2001 reissue

Remastered version with re-sequenced track listing.

 "History Never Repeats" (Neil Finn)
 "Dirty Creature" (Tim Finn/Nigel Griggs/Neil Finn)
 "I See Red" (Tim Finn)
 "My Mistake" (Tim Finn/Eddie Rayner)
 "I Got You" (Neil Finn)
 "Shark Attack" (Tim Finn)
 "One Step Ahead" (Neil Finn)
 "Pioneer" (Eddie Rayner)
 "Six Months in a Leaky Boat" (Tim Finn/Split Enz)
 "Poor Boy" (Tim Finn)
 "I Hope I Never" (Tim Finn)
 "Message to My Girl" (Neil Finn)
 "Strait Old Line" (Neil Finn)
 "Late Last Night" (Phil Judd)
 "Charlie" [live New Zealand, 1993] (Tim Finn)
 "Give It a Whirl" (Tim Finn/Neil Finn)

Notes
Track 14: Single version used on original 1989 issue; album version used here.
Track 16: 1984 live version used on original 1989 issue; 1993 live version used here.

NZ/AUS 2002 30th anniversary edition

Remastered version with same re-sequenced track listing as 2001 reissue, plus bonus track "I Walk Away" and white cardboard slipcase.

 "History Never Repeats" (Neil Finn)
 "Dirty Creature" (Tim Finn/Nigel Griggs/Neil Finn)
 "I See Red" (Tim Finn)
 "My Mistake" (Tim Finn/Eddie Rayner)
 "I Walk Away" [bonus track] (Neil Finn)
 "I Got You" (Neil Finn)
 "Shark Attack" (Tim Finn)
 "One Step Ahead" (Neil Finn)
 "Pioneer" (Eddie Rayner)
 "Six Months in a Leaky Boat" (Tim Finn/Split Enz)
 "Poor Boy" (Tim Finn)
 "I Hope I Never" (Tim Finn)
 "Message to My Girl" (Neil Finn)
 "Strait Old Line" (Neil Finn)
 "Late Last Night" (Phil Judd)
 "Give It a Whirl" (Tim Finn/Neil Finn)
 "Charlie" [live New Zealand, 1993] (Tim Finn)

Notes
Track 15: Single version used on original 1989 issue; album version used here.
Track 17: 1984 live version used on original 1989 issue; 1993 live version used here.

Charts

Certifications and sales

References

Split Enz compilation albums
1987 greatest hits albums
A&M Records compilation albums
Mushroom Records compilation albums
Universal Music Group compilation albums